Ernestine "Byrd" Bazemore is a North Carolina politician.

Early life and education
Bazemore earned a bachelor's of science degree in criminal justice and criminology.

Career
Bazemore has served as an educator. In 2014, Bazemore was first elected to the Bertie County Commissioner. She served as vice chair of the commission from 2016 to 2017, and as chair in 2018. On November 3, 2020, Bazemore won a close election against Republican nominee Thomas Hester Jr. for the North Carolina Senate seat represented the 3rd district. She won 52% of the vote. She assumed office on January 1, 2021. In early January 2021, Bazemore was appointed to three legislative committees: the State and Local Government committee, the Appropriations on General Government Committee, and the Pensions Committee.

Personal life
Bazemore lives in Windsor, North Carolina. Bazemore has three children.

References

External links

Living people
African-American women in politics
African-American state legislators in North Carolina
County commissioners in North Carolina
Educators from North Carolina
Democratic Party North Carolina state senators
People from Windsor, North Carolina
Women state legislators in North Carolina
21st-century American politicians
21st-century American women politicians
Year of birth missing (living people)
21st-century African-American women
21st-century African-American politicians